The Roman Catholic Diocese of Kaolack is a diocese located in the city of Kaolack in the Ecclesiastical province of Dakar in Senegal.

History
 February 21, 1957: Established as Apostolic Prefecture of Kaolack from the Metropolitan Archdiocese of Dakar and Diocese of Ziguinchor
 July 6, 1965: Promoted as Diocese of Kaolack

Special churches
 The cathedral is Cathédrale Saint-Théophile in Kaolack.

Leadership
 Prefect Apostolic of Kaolack (Roman rite) 
 Fr. Théophile Albert Cadoux, M.S.C. (1957.03.29 – 1965.07.06 see below)
 Bishops of Kaolack (Roman rite)
 Théophile Albert Cadoux, M.S.C. (see above 1965.07.06 – 1974.07.01)
 Théodore-Adrien Sarr (1974.07.01 – 2000.06.02), appointed Archbishop of Dakar (Cardinal in 2007)
 Benjamin Ndiaye (2001.06.15 - 2014.12.22), appointed Archbishop of Dakar
 Martin Boucar Tine, S.S.S. (2018.07.25 –)

See also
Roman Catholicism in Senegal

References

Sources
 GCatholic.org
 Catholic Hierarchy 

Kaolack
Christian organizations established in 1957
Roman Catholic dioceses and prelatures established in the 20th century
Roman Catholic Ecclesiastical Province of Dakar